Udod Evgeniy Grigoryevich (born on May 30, 1973, Krivyi Rih) is a former Chairman of the Dnipropetrovsk Regional Council of Dnipropetrovsk region.

Biography
1994-1998 – Mechanic and Equipment Maintenance Assistant at the «Кrivbasruda», in Novokrivorozskiy state Coal Preparation Plant, Public Traded Company «Ingulets Mining Preparation Plant».
1998-2003 – «SMPP» (South Mining Preparation Plant). Initially was hired as Engineer at the Distribution Department. After that, filled a position of the Head of Cooperation with metallurgical plants Department. Later Distribution Department Chief’s Assistant.
2003-2006 – «CMPP» (Central Mining Preparation Plant) Director of Distribution and Marketing. Later – Executive Director.
2006-2009 – Executive Director of «NMPP» (North Mining Preparation Plant). Later Chief Director.
2006 – Deputy of the Dnepropetrovsk Regional Council V convocation. Head of the Committee of Building, Transport, Communication and Improvement of Public Services.
2009—2010 – Sales Director at the Mining Division «Меtinvest».
Since June 2010 – Chairman of the Dnipropetrovsk Regional Council V convocation.
From November 2010 - Chairman of the Dnipropetrovsk Regional Council VI convocation until he was succeeded by Prygunov Glib.

Honors
2006 – was awarded  "Honorary Certificate  of Cabinet of Ministers of Ukraine"
2007 – was honorary entitled as “Merited Industrial worker of Ukraine”

References

1973 births
Living people
Ukrainian politicians
Laureates of the Diploma of the Verkhovna Rada of Ukraine
Recipients of the Honorary Diploma of the Cabinet of Ministers of Ukraine